Chateau Pacheteau, in Calistoga, California in Napa Valley, was listed on the National Register of Historic Places in 2015.

The "chateau" is a four-story residence built in 1906. The National Register nominator termed it an example of "stone church architecture", and asserted it resembles Richardsonian Romanesque architecture. Its "most unusual feature is the defensive stepped false front façade including a crenellated parapet composed of crenels and merlons, which appear again above the stone portico below. The parapet obscures the wood shake covered gable roof behind it."

It was commissioned by Jacques Pacheteau.  In its construction W.A. Harrison of St. Helena was in charge of carpentry, and the masonry work was done by Bennasini & Maggetta.

The listing included a second contributing building--a detached carriage house--and five non-contributing buildings.  The carriage house, also built in 1906, is also built of stone, and is two-storied with a central cupola above.  It was designed by architect William Corlett.

See also
Chateau Chevalier (1891), in St. Helena

References

National Register of Historic Places in Napa County, California
Buildings and structures completed in 1906
1906 establishments in California